McLin Glacier is a tributary glacier which flows north of McKenzie Nunatak into Graveson Glacier, in the Bowers Mountains of Antarctica. The glacier saddles with Carryer Glacier on the west and is nourished in part by Edlin Névé. It was named by the New Zealand Geological Survey Antarctic Expedition to this area, 1967–68, for Lieutenant Commander Robert D. McLin, U.S. Navy, a pilot of LC-130 Hercules aircraft in Antarctica that season.

References

Glaciers of Pennell Coast